Santo contra el cerebro diabolico (Santo vs. the Diabolical Brain) is a 1963 Mexican action film directed by Federico Curiel, written by Curiel and Antonio Orellana and starring El Santo.

Cast
 Santo as himself (credited as Santo el Enmascarado de Plata)
 Fernando Casanova as Fernando Lavalle
 Ana Bertha Lepe as Virginia 
 Roberto Ramírez Garza as Conrado
 Luis Aceves Castañeda as Refugio Canales
 Celia Viveros as La Jarocha
 José Chávez as Roque
 Augusto Benedico as Santo's assistant
 Manuel Dondé as Carlos

References

External links

 
 

Mexican action horror films
1960s action horror films
1963 films
1960s Spanish-language films
Cultural depictions of El Santo
1960s Mexican films